The Baren Township conflict also known as the Baren Uprising was an armed conflict that took place between ethnic Uyghur militants fighting for East Turkestan independence and Chinese government forces in 1990 between 5 April and 10 April in the township of Baren.

Background
According to Chinese records, four major planning meetings were held in the run up to the conflict, one of which was devoted to the procuring of supplies, including weapons and uniforms. Toward the end of March 1990, the militants ran a training camp to prepare for the fight ahead. Collected money was used to buy weapons and vehicles. According to Chinese records, the militants were forced to move more quickly than they had intended because their plot was on the verge of being discovered. Hundreds of homemade bombs were made in a blacksmith shop in Kashgar and transported to Baren before the incident. Numerous senior diplomatic and counter-terrorism sources believe that Afghan militia were directly involved in the incident. 

The militants were reportedly motivated by a number of grievances against the government, including mass migration of Han Chinese into Xinjiang and forced abortions of local Uyghur women.

Incident
On April 5, a group of men, led by Zeydin Yusup, the leader of the Free Turkistan Movement,  marched on and surrounded the local government offices, shouting anti-Han slogans and calling for and end to Chinese rule.  

They also made a number of demands, including the end of Han Chinese immigration to Xinjiang, and that the Chinese leave Xinjiang, and the re-establishment of an independent East Turkistan.  

Later in the day, Yusup returned with a larger group between 200 and 300 men and launched an assault on the government buildings.  An armed police detachment of 130 men that was dispatched to relieve the siege was attacked by the militants. In the ensuing clash, 6 police officers were killed and 13 were wounded; A police bus was also burnt. The insurgents took 5 police officers hostage, and captured weapons and ammunition. 19 of the militants were captured. 

Throughout the night, the siege of the government offices continued, with militants throwing explosives and firing at the buildings.  By morning, reinforcements from the PLA and local militia arrived in the area, pursued the militants into the mountains. Over the next several days, most of the militants were killed or captured in engagements with the government troops. The last militants were captured on April 10.

Aftermath
According to government sources, the conflict ended with a total of 23 dead, including 7 police officers and soldiers, and 16 militants. 21 people were wounded, and 232 Uyghur fighters were captured. In July 1990 the Chinese government in Xinjiang announced the arrest of 7,900 people citing the "criminal activities of ethnic splittists and other criminal offenders" as the reason.

In 2020, the East Turkistan Government-in-Exile commemorated the thirtieth anniversary of the conflict in its official journal.

In April 2021, the Chinese ambassador to Turkey was summoned after responding to statements by Turkish politicians Meral Akşener and Mansur Yavaş in commemoration of those killed in the conflict.

References

Political riots
Xinjiang conflict
1990 in China
1990 riots
East Turkestan independence movement